Nathan Thomas Hopkins (October 27, 1852 – February 11, 1927) was an American religious leader and politician who served one term as a U.S. Representative from Kentucky from 1895 to 1897.

Early life and career 
Born in Ashe County, North Carolina, Hopkins moved to Pike County, Kentucky where he was a standout pupil in the common schooling system and, eventually, rose to become a prominent agriculturist in the region. Also, ordained to the ministry in 1876, he was an active leader of the Baptist Church in Yeager, Kentucky, for over half a century. Thereafter becoming noteworthy across the county for his leadership and oratorical skills, Hopkins was voted in as County tax assessor for Floyd County from 1878 to 1890.

He married Nancy Jane Johnson. (February 26, 1850 – February 16, 1937)

Political career 
He later moved back to his home state of North Carolina where he was elected to the North Carolina House of Representatives from 1893 to 1894 and 1923 to 1924. Nonetheless, he returned to Pike County, KY where he, then, a year later successfully contested the incumbent Representative of Kentucky's 10 District, Joseph M. Kendall to the Fifty-fourth Congress (February 18, 1897 – March 3, 1897) as a Republican.

Congress 
Hopkins served as the Representative to Kentucky's 10th District in the United States Congress for one term, from 1895 to 1897. Afterwards, he retired to his home in Yeager, KY in Pike County where he was a merchant, timber harvester, lumberman and farmer. Later on, he was an unsuccessful candidate for election to the Fifty-seventh Congress in 1900.

Retirement and death 
For the rest of his life he was committed to only agriculture and the Church near Yeager, Kentucky. He died in Pikeville, Kentucky, February 11, 1927, where he is interred at Potter Cemetery, Yeager, Kentucky.

References

1852 births
1927 deaths
People from Ashe County, North Carolina
Republican Party members of the North Carolina House of Representatives
Republican Party members of the United States House of Representatives from Kentucky